The Co-Cathedral of Ferrol or Concatedral de San Julián de Ferrol is a Roman Catholic church in the town of Ferrol in the autonomous community of Galicia, Spain.

History
The church was erected in the 18th-century, designed by Julián Sánchez Bort, who based his Neoclassical design on the church of Sant'Andrea delle Fratte in Rome. 

The church was made co-cathedral along with the Cathedral of Mondoñedo in 1959.

References

18th-century Roman Catholic church buildings in Spain
Neoclassical architecture in Galicia (Spain)
Ferrol
Churches in Galicia (Spain)
Neoclassical church buildings in Spain